Virginia Neal Blue (1910-1970) was an American businesswoman and politician, Colorado State Treasurer from 1967 to 1970, and the first woman elected to executive office in the state.

Early life
Virginia Neal Blue was born in Meeker, Colorado She earned a bachelor's degree in economics from the University of Colorado in 1931.

Career
Blue was one of the Regents of the University of Colorado, the governing board of the University of Colorado system, from 1953 to 1959, and chairman of the Colorado Commission on the Status of Women from 1964 to 1966. She was Colorado State Treasurer from 1967 to 1970, and the first woman elected to executive office in the state.

Personal life
She married James Elliot Blue (1907-1986). Their sons Neal Blue and Linden Blue took a subsidiary of Chevron private as General Atomics.

References

1910 births
1970 deaths
People from Meeker, Colorado
University of Colorado Boulder alumni
State treasurers of Colorado
Colorado Republicans
University of Colorado people
American real estate brokers